A lunar deity is a deity who represents the Moon, or an aspect of it. Lunar deities and Moon worship can be found throughout most of recorded history in various forms. The following is a list of lunar deities:

African

American

Aztec mythology
 Deity Metztli
 Goddess Coyolxauhqui
 God Tecciztecatl

Cahuilla mythology
 Goddess Menily

Hopi mythology
 God Muuya

Incan mythology
 Goddess Mama Killa
 Goddess Ka-Ata-Killa
 God Coniraya

Inuit mythology
 God Alignak 
 God Igaluk
 God Tarqiup Inua

Lakota mythology
 Goddess Hanwi

Maya mythology
 Goddess Awilix; Xbalanque was her mortal (male) incarnation
 Maya moon goddess

Muisca mythology
 Goddess Huitaca
 Goddess Chía

Nivaclé Mythology
 Jive'cla

Pawnee mythology
 God Pah

Tupi Guarani mythology
 God Abaangui
 Goddess Arasy
 God/Goddess Jaci (gender depends on tribe)

Voodoo
 God Kalfu

Asian

Ainu mythology
 God Kunnechup Kamui

Anatolian
 God Arma (Luwian religion)
 God Kašku (Hittite mythology)
 God Men (Phrygian mythology)

Chinese mythology
 Jie Lin, God that carries the Moon across the night sky 
 Chang Xi Mother of twelve moons corresponding to the twelve months of the year
 Chang'e Immortal that lives on the Moon
 Tai yin xing jun of Investiture of the Gods in taoism and  Chinese folk religion 
 Tu'er Ye Rabbit god that lives on the Moon
 Wu Gang Immortal that lives on the Moon

Elamite
 God Napir

Hinduism

 God Agni, invoked as a moon deity in some hymns
 God Chandra or Soma, The moon god

Hurro-Urartian
 God Kušuḫ (Hurrian mythology)
 Goddess Selardi (Urartian mythology)

Indonesian mythology
 Goddess Ratih
 Goddess Silewe Nazarate

Japanese mythology
 God Tsukuyomi

Korean mythology
 Goddess Myeongwol

Mari mythology
 God Tõlze

Philippine mythologies

Kabigat (Bontok mythology): the goddess of the moon who cut off the head of Chal-chal's son; her action is the origin of headhunting
Bulan (Ifugao mythology): the moon deity of the night in charge of nighttime
Moon Deity (Ibaloi mythology): the deity who teased Kabunian for not yet having a spouse
Delan (Bugkalot mythology): deity of the moon, worshiped with the sun and stars; congenial with Elag; during quarrels, Elag sometimes covers Delan's face, causing the different phases of the moon; giver of light and growth
Bulan (Ilocano mythology): the moon god of peace who comforted the grieving Abra
Bulan (Pangasinense mythology): the merry and mischievous moon god, whose dim palace was the source of the perpetual light which became the stars; guides the ways of thieves
Wife of Mangetchay (Kapampangan mythology): wife of Mangetchay who gave birth to their daughter whose beauty sparked the great war; lives in the Moon
Mayari (Kapampangan mythology): the moon goddess who battled her brother, Apolaqui
Apûng Malyari (Kapampangan mythology): moon god who lives in Mount Pinatubo and ruler of the eight rivers
Mayari (Tagalog mythology): goddess of the moon; sometimes identified as having one eye; ruler of the world during nighttime and daughter of Bathala
Dalagang nasa Buwan (Tagalog mythology): the maiden of the moon
Dalagang Binubukot (Tagalog mythology): the cloistered maiden in the moon
Unnamed Moon God (Tagalog mythology): the night watchman who tattled on Rajo's theft, leading to an eclipse
Bulan-hari (Tagalog mythology): one of the deities sent by Bathala to aid the people of Pinak; can command rain to fall; married to Bitu-in
Bulan (Bicolano mythology): son of Dagat and Paros; joined Daga's rebellion and died; his body became the Moon; in another myth, he was alive and from his cut arm, the earth was established, and from his tears, the rivers and seas were established
Haliya (Bicolano mythology): the goddess of the moon, often depicted with a golden mask on her face
Libulan (Bisaya mythology): the copper-bodied son of Lidagat and Lihangin; killed by Kaptan's rage during the great revolt; his body became the moon
Bulan (Bisaya mythology): the moon deity who gives light to sinners and guides them in the night
Launsina (Capiznon mythology): the goddess of the Sun, Moon, stars, and seas, and the most beloved because people seek forgiveness from her
Diwata na Magbabaya (Bukidnon mythology): simply referred as Magbabaya; the good supreme deity and supreme planner who looks like a man; created the Earth and the first eight elements, namely bronze, gold, coins, rock, clouds, rain, iron, and water; using the elements, he also created the sea, sky, Moon, and stars; also known as the pure god who wills all things; one of three deities living in the realm called Banting
Bulon La Mogoaw (T'boli mythology): one of the two supreme deities; married to Kadaw La Sambad; lives in the seventh layer of the universe
Moon Deity (Maranao mythology): divine being depicted in an anthropomorphic form as a beautiful young woman; angels serve as her charioteers

Vietnamese mythology
 Goddess Thần Mặt Trăng, the embodiment of the moon, the daughter of Ông Trời
 Goddess Hằng Nga, goddess who lives on the moon

Semitic mythology
 God Aglibol (Palmarene mythology)
 God Almaqah (Sabaean mythology)
 God Baal-hamon (Punic religion)
 God Saggar (Eblaite religion)
 God Sin (Mesopotamian mythology)
 God Ta'lab (Arabian mythology)
 God Wadd (Minaean mythology)
 God Yarikh (Amorite and Ugaritic mythology)

Turkic mythology
 God Ay Ata

European

Oceanic

Malagasy mythology
 God Andriambahomanana

Polynesian mythology
 God Avatea
 God Fati
 Goddess Hina
 Goddess Mahina
 God Marama

Australian Aboriginal mythology
 God Bahloo

Mandjindja mythology
 God Kidili

Yolŋu mythology
 God Ngalindi

See also

 Allah as a lunar deity
 Astrotheology
 List of solar deities
 Man in the Moon
 Moon idol
 Moon rabbit
 Nature worship
 Solar deity

References

Bibliography
 
 
 
 
 Harley, Timothy. Moon Lore. London: S. Sonnenschein [etc.], 1885. pp. 77–139.

Lunar deities
Lists of deities
Deities